The second season of Tokyo Ghoul:re is the sequel to the first season of Tokyo Ghoul:re, adapted from the manga of the same name by Sui Ishida. It is the fourth and final season within the overall anime franchise. The anime is produced by Pierrot, with Pierrot Plus providing production assistance, and is directed by Odahiro Watanabe. The anime aired from October 9 to December 25, 2018 on Tokyo MX, Sun TV, TVA, TVQ and BS11.

The anime is a direct sequel to the first season of Tokyo Ghoul:re, and covers the final arc of the manga.

Yutaka Yamada returns as composer for the anime's score.

The series was released in Japan on home video by TC Entertainment, with the first volume released on December 21, 2018, and the final volume released on March 27, 2019.

Funimation announced that they would be simulcasting the series in North America, while also producing a dub as it airs. Anime Limited has licensed the series for the United Kingdom and Ireland, who simulcasted the series on Crunchyroll. In Australia and New Zealand, Madman Entertainment licensed the series, and simulcasted the series on AnimeLab in Japanese, and with Funimation's English dub.

The first episode received an advanced screening event on Yahoo! Japan's GyaO! service on September 29, 2018, at 12:00 pm JST. The advanced screening only showcased the main part of the anime, with the opening and ending themes omitted from the screening. Outside of Japan, Wakanim provided an advanced screening on October 5, 2018 in France, and AnimeLab provided an advanced screening on October 8, 2018 in Australia and New Zealand.

Episode list

Home video release

References

External links
  

Tokyo Ghoul episode lists